Anti-Money Laundering Office may refer to:

Anti-Money Laundering Office (Thailand)
Anti-Money Laundering Office, Executive Yuan

See also 

 AMLO (disambiguation)